, occasionally nicknamed Otokomatsuri, is a Japanese anime director. He started at animation studio Vega Entertainment, and later joined Shaft. He is best known for directing Puella Magi Madoka Magica and its subsequent film trilogy alongside Akiyuki Shinbo, the latter trilogy which subsequently garnered ¥2 billion, making it a box-office success.

Career
Miyamoto joined the anime industry in 2002 as a production manager and assistant episode director for Vega Entertainment on their adaptation of Leiji Matsumoto's Gun Frontier manga series. In 2003 and 2004, he debuted as an episode director and storyboard artist with F-Zero: GP Legend, and began doing outsource work with Vega for Madhouse in 2004. For the next 3 years, he served with Madhouse, most prominent as an episode director for Monster, and then in 2006 joined studio Shaft. At Shaft, he quickly became a prominent director alongside Akiyuki Shinbo, Shin Oonuma, and Tatsuya Oishi. In 2008, he debuted with a series as the chief unit director with (Zoku) Sayonara, Zetsubou-Sensei alongside Shinbo. In the following years, Miyamoto directed several more series with Shinbo, and in 2011 they directed Puella Magi Madoka Magica, which became a critical hit and, alongside Bakemonogatari, is considered to be one of the series that pushed the studio into the spotlight. Subsequently, Miyamoto was tasked with directing the series' film trilogy, with Shinbo acting as chief director over the films. In 2018, it was announced that the spin-off Magia Record mobile game would receive an adaptation by the studio; the following year, it was announced that Miyamoto would serve as an assistant director and director alongside Shaft directors Kenjirou Okada, Midori Yoshizawa, Doroinu of Gekidan Inu Curry, with Shinbo serving as an animation supervisor on the project.

Style
Miyamoto described himself as being a "heretic" at Shaft-- someone who, in a company of many differing directors, is only good at doing "plain work", and isn't particularly original or creative. Shinbo described Miyamoto in a similar way, but said that he was more like a professional craftsman who leaves their mark in places that cannot be seen.

Works

Television series
 Highlights roles with series directorial duties.

OVAs/ONAs
 Highlights roles with series directorial duties.

Films
 Highlights roles with film directorial duties.

Video games
 Highlights roles with major directorial duties.

Notes

Works cited

References

External links

Japanese film directors
Japanese television directors
Anime directors
Living people
1977 births